Pertti Mutru (18 September 1930 – 30 October 1964) was a Finnish basketball player. He competed in the men's tournament at the 1952 Summer Olympics.

References

1930 births
1964 deaths
Finnish men's basketball players
Olympic basketball players of Finland
Basketball players at the 1952 Summer Olympics
Sportspeople from Vyborg